The 2021–22 North Texas Mean Green women's basketball team represents the University of North Texas during the 2021–22 NCAA Division I women's basketball season. The team is led by seventh-year head coach Jalie Mitchell, and plays their home games at the UNT Coliseum in Denton, Texas as a member of Conference USA.

Schedule and results

|-
!colspan=12 style=|Exhibition

|-
!colspan=12 style=|Non-conference regular season

|-
!colspan=12 style=|CUSA regular season

|-
!colspan=12 style=| C-USA Tournament

|-
!colspan=12 style=| WNIT

See also
 2021–22 North Texas Mean Green men's basketball team

Notes

References

North Texas Mean Green women's basketball seasons
North Texas
North Texas Mean Green women's basketball
North Texas Mean Green women's basketball
North Texas